Summer Knights is the second mixtape by American rapper Joey Bada$$. It was released on July 1, 2013, by Cinematic Music Group. The mixtape was planned to be released as an EP, to prelude the release of his debut album B4.DA.$$, but instead it was announced to be a full-length mixtape. The mixtape features production from Chuck Strangers, Kirk Knight, MF Doom, Statik Selektah, DJ Premier, Lee Bannon, Oddisee, Navie D, and Bruce Leekix. The mixtape features more original instrumentals than his first mixtape 1999 which was primarily samples.

The extended play has inverted into the re-release from the mixtape, titled Summer Knights EP; released on October 29, 2013.

Background 

On May 22, 2013, Joey Bada$$ announced the official release date of his next solo project, Summer Knights EP on June 12, 2013, which marks as the one-year anniversary release of his breakthrough mixtape 1999. On May 28, 2013, Bada$$ announced Summer Knights will no longer be an EP, and instead announced that this project will just be a full-length mixtape. He revealed that the mixtape will feature 17 tracks, along with the production, which will be handled by Statik Selektah, Lee Bannon, Chuck Strangers and Kirk Knight, among others.

The mixtape features guest appearances by his fellow Pro Era members, along the additional production by DJ Premier, The Alchemist, MF Doom and Oddisee, among others. On the announced release date, Joey Badass revealed on Twitter that the mixtape was pushed back until July 1, 2013. This was also said to be a "rest in peace" mixtape to Pro Era founder and close friend Capital STEEZ, further indicated in the 16th track entitled "#LongLiveSTEELO."

Critical reception

Summer Knights received generally favorable reviews from music critics. At Metacritic, which assigns a normalized rating out of 100 to reviews from mainstream critics, the album received an average score of 66, which indicates "generally favorable", based on 10 reviews. Exclaim! magazine's Chris Dart found Badass' rapping versatile and skillful, and said that the mixtape is exceptional at its high points, despite being a few unnecessary songs overlong. Abrea Armstrong of XXL felt that his lyrics are still confident, but now informed by new life experiences, and recommended Summer Knights to hip hop buffs rather than Badass' typically teenage listeners, although she wrote that "Joey is here to prove that they're  the same." In a mixed review, Phillip Mlynar of Spin felt that Summer Knights lacks the immediacy of his early music and found his rapping dull and enervated, which he mused is a result of pressures and expectations from the music industry.

On December 24, 2013, XXL positioned it at number 19 on their list of the best mixtapes of 2013. They commented saying, "One thing is clear when you listen to the tape, he’s not kidding around, as he unleashes some bone-shattering bars with a calm cold assassin-like demeanor. 1999 was more of a coming-of-age tale from Joey while Summer Knights provides as a worthy follow-up illustrating his maturity and growth. Pro-Era’s boom-bap ’90s chill-vibe is still prominent in the album, however with an extra kick making it sound very refreshing."

Track listing
All credits are adapted from Allmusic.

Digital download 
Most mixtapes are digital downloads that are free and are usually not released for any profit. Summer Knights however is available both for free download as well as purchase on iTunes and Google Play (the latter being available for free streaming as well).

Personnel 
All credits are adapted from AllMusic.

 The Alchemist – producer
 T'nah Apex – featured artist
 Lee Bannon – producer
 Collie Buddz – featured artist
 Nyck Caution – featured artist
 Navie D – producer
 Dirty Sanchez – featured artist
 DJ Premier – producer
 MF DOOM – producer
 Dessy Hinds – featured artist
 Kirk Knight – featured artist, producer
 Oddisee – producer
 Pro Era – featured artists
 Rokamouth – featured artist
 Smoke DZA – featured artist
 Statik Selektah – producer
 Chuck Strangers – featured artist, producer

References

External links 
 

2013 mixtape albums
Albums produced by DJ Premier
Albums produced by Statik Selektah
Albums produced by the Alchemist (musician)
Albums produced by MF Doom
Joey Badass albums
Cinematic Music Group albums
Pro Era albums
Albums produced by Kirk Knight
Albums produced by Fred Warmsley